Jamie Suzanne (pseudonym) is the pen name used by multiple ghost-writers of the Sweet Valley Kids, Sweet Valley Twins, Sweet Valley Junior High, Sweet Valley High, and Sweet Valley University book series. The pseudonym is a combination of the names of Francine Pascal’s daughters. Authors known to have written as Jamie Suzanne include: Louise Hawes, Linda Joy Singleton, Robynn Clairday, and Nina Kiriki Hoffman.

Select Bibliography

Sweet Valley Twins
 #5 - Sneaking Out (by Louise Hawes)
 #6 - The New Girl (by Louise Hawes)
 #13 - Stretching the Truth (by Louise Hawes)

Sweet Valley Junior High
 #12 - Third Wheel (by Nina Kiriki Hoffman)

Sweet Valley High
 #41 - Outcast (by Louise Hawes)

Sweet Valley University
 #24 - His Secret Past (by Robynn Clairday)
 #27 - Elizabeth and Todd Forever (by Robynn Clairday)
 #30 - Beauty and the Beach (by Robynn Clairday)
 #59 - Barnyard Battle (by Linda Joy Singleton)

See also 
 Sweet Valley High

References 

American children's writers
American writers of young adult literature
Sweet Valley (franchise)